John Duncombe (1729-1786) published his "canon-forming" celebration of British women writers as The Feminiad in 1754, though the title was revised as The Feminead in the second, 1757 edition.

The argument
The piece is an essay in verse, a form popular in the eighteenth century, consisting of 380 lines of heroic couplets. Duncombe argues that women "shine, / In mind and person equally divine" and urges his readers to resist the "undisputed reign" of "Prejudice" and instead "sing the glories of a sister-choir." He appeals to his readers' sense of nationalism by contrasting "free-born" "British nymphs" to a stereotypical image of women in a "Seraglio," and situates his subjects in a cultural lineage stemming from classical Greece and Rome.

Duncombe takes care to clarify that his support of women artists only extends to those who continue to fulfill their assigned feminine roles and suggests that the pursuit of art and culture might keep women away from more frivolous pursuits:

Duncombe makes a selective survey of British women writers. He quickly passes over the racier writers of the previous age such as Behn, Centlivre, and Manley, as well as memoirists Phillips, Pilkington, and  Vane— part of "a pattern of contradictory inscription and subordination of women writers that recurs throughout eighteenth-century and Romantic formulations of literary tradition" — to catalogue the moral and artistic virtues of writers still, in most cases, living. Many of the writers mentioned were connected to the Blue Stockings Society, an informal women's social and educational movement in England in the mid-18th century.

Duncombe does not address the subject of writing as a paid profession, but frames it as an avocation. The Feminead ends on a strategic note, with the argument that women who are encouraged to learn and create make better wives and mothers. Such appeals to the presumed self-interests of the reader were not uncommon in early pro-feminist texts.

Context
Duncombe's poem was popular and well-received but not unique; it is one of "multiple attempts to promote and anthologize women writers as important members of the national literary tradition," part of what scholar Moira Ferguson calls an "eruption of female panegyrics," mainly by men, that includes George Ballard's Memoirs of British Ladies (biographies of sixty-five notable women; 1752); Theophilus Cibber's Lives of the Poets (1753); George Colman and Bonnell Thornton's anthology, Poems by Eminent Ladies (1755); Thomas Amory's Memoirs of Several Ladies of Great Britain (1755); and Biographium faemineum: the female worthies, or, Memoirs of the most illustrious ladies, of all ages and nations, who have been eminently distinguished for their magnanimity, learning, genius, virtue, piety, and other excellent endowments. London: Printed for S. Crowder, 1766. 2 vols. (Anon; 1766). In 1774, Mary Scott published The Female Advocate; a poem. Occasioned upon reading Mr. Duncombe's Feminead (London: Joseph Johnson) in which she expresses her "grateful pleasure" to Duncombe, as well as her desire to recognize a further group of writers: she includes above fifty, three of whom Duncombe had recognized: Chapone, Philips, and Pilkington. All these texts taken together, according to Betty Schellenberg, indicate the broad cultural significance of women's authorship by the mid-eighteenth century.

Writers named in The Feminead

See also
The Female Advocate
The feminead: or, female genius (Wikisource)
Mary Scott
Women's writing (literary category)

Etexts
Digitized version of Augustan Reprint Society edition (1981) available at the Internet Archive
Digitized version of 2nd edition available at Google Books

References

External links
The Bluestocking Archive

Lists of women
18th-century poetry
Women's history
English women poets
18th-century British women writers
18th-century British writers
18th-century English women
18th-century English people